Leandro Leonel Brey (Lomas de Zamora, 21 September 2002) is an Argentine professional footballer who plays as a goalkeeper for Boca Juniors.

Biography 
The first experience of Brey as goalkeeper was in his home-town club Club Olimpia, where he played during his childhood. With only 10 years old, Brey arrived in Los Andes playing as defender. Nevertheless the club released him soon after. Brey asked Los Andes to try as goalkeeper, being accepted again by the club. Brey continued his career in the youth divisions of Los Andes until his debut in the senior squad in March 2021 vs Argentino de Quilmes, when he replaced Federico Díaz who had been sent off. Since then, Brey was the starting goalkeeper for Los Andes, which ended the season being the team with less goals conceded (20).

In February 2022 Brey was transferred to Boca Juniors for US$450,000 as the third goalkeeper behind Agustín Rossi and Javier García. Since then, Brey has been the frecquent goalkeeper for Boca Juniors' reserve team.

Brey debuted in the senior squad on April 12, in the 2022 Copa Libertadores match vs Bolivian side Always Ready. Brey substituted Agustín Rossi after he injured on 45'. Boca won the match 2–0.

Career statistics 

 

Notes

Honours
Boca Juniors
Primera División: 2022
Copa de la Liga Profesional: 2022
Supercopa Argentina: 2022

References

2002 births
Living people
Sportspeople from Misiones Province
Argentine footballers
Association football goalkeepers
Boca Juniors footballers
Argentine Primera División players